The 1991 Kentucky gubernatorial election took place on November 5, 1991. Incumbent Governor Wallace Wilkinson was not eligible to seek a second term due to term limits established by the Kentucky Constitution, creating an open seat. At the time, Kentucky was one of two states, along with Virginia, which prohibited its governors from serving immediate successive terms. The Democratic nominee, Lieutenant Governor Brereton Jones, defeated Republican nominee and U.S. Congressman Larry J. Hopkins to win a term as governor.

Democratic primary

Candidates
 Brereton Jones, Lieutenant Governor of Kentucky
 Scotty Baesler, Mayor of Lexington
 Floyd G. Poore, physician
 Gatewood Galbraith, perennial candidate

Results

Republican primary

Candidates
 Larry J. Hopkins, U.S. Representative
 Larry Forgy, counsel to Governor Louie B. Nunn

Results

General election

Results

References

1991
Gubernatorial
Kentucky
November 1991 events in the United States